Alberto Angelini (born 28 September 1974 in Savona) is a retired water polo player from Italy, who represented his native country at four consecutive Summer Olympics, starting in 1996 (Atlanta, Georgia). He was a member of the men's national team that claimed the bronze medal in 1996.

See also
 Italy men's Olympic water polo team records and statistics
 List of Olympic medalists in water polo (men)
 List of players who have appeared in multiple men's Olympic water polo tournaments
 List of men's Olympic water polo tournament top goalscorers
 List of World Aquatics Championships medalists in water polo

References

External links
 
 

1974 births
Living people
Italian male water polo players
Olympic water polo players of Italy
Olympic bronze medalists for Italy
Olympic medalists in water polo
Water polo players at the 1996 Summer Olympics
Water polo players at the 2000 Summer Olympics
Water polo players at the 2004 Summer Olympics
Water polo players at the 2008 Summer Olympics
Medalists at the 1996 Summer Olympics
World Aquatics Championships medalists in water polo
People from Savona
Sportspeople from the Province of Savona